The New South Wales Systems Biology Initiative, directed by Marc Wilkins is a non-profit facility within the School of Biotechnology and Biomolecular Sciences at the University of New South Wales. Their focus is undertaking basic and applied research in the development and application of bioinformatics for genomics and proteomics.

Research conducted at the Systems Biology Initiative
Researchers at the facility are currently working on the following projects:

Methylation on the proteome of Saccharomyces cerevisiae
Modifications generate conditional effects on proteins, whereby their covalent attachment to amino acids will cause perturbation of a particular protein resulting in an impact on the potential interactions of its newly modified form. Methylation is one of the most recognised post-translational modifications in histones for chromatin structure and gene expression. It is also one of many modifications found on the short N-terminal regions of histones, which assemble to form the histone code, which regulates chromatin assembly and epigenetic gene regulation. Identification of methylation across the interactome is poorly documented. Researchers at the System Biology Initiative have been identifying techniques to identify novel methylated lysine and arginine residues via mass spectrometry and peptide mass fingerprinting. Currently researchers are in the process of utilising these techniques to identify novel methylated residues in the Saccharomyces cerevisiae interactome.

Separation and identification of protein complexes
Large-scale analysis of protein complexes is an emerging difficulty as methods for the fractionation of protein complexes that are not compatible with downstream proteomic techniques. The Systems Biology Initiative is utilising the technique of blue native continuous elution electrophoresis (BN-CEE). This method generates liquid-phase fractions of protein complexes. The resulting complexes can be further analysed by polyacrylamide gel electrophoresis and mass spectrometry. This will help identify the constituent proteins of many complexes. Currently researchers are employing this technique on the Saccharomyces cerevisiae cellular lysate.

Visualising proteins, complexes and interaction networks
The integration of biological data, including protein structures, interactions etc. can be generated through automated technology. The importance of such data can often be lost without proper visualisation of the data. The Systems Biology Initiative is currently working on an adaptation of the Skyrails Visualisation System. This system, called the interactonium uses a virtual cell  for the visualisation of the interaction network, protein complexes and protein 3-D structures of Saccharomyces cerevisiae. The tool can display complex networks of up to 40 000 proteins or 6000 multiprotein complexes. The Interactorium permits multi-level viewing of the molecular biology of the cell. The Interactorium is available for download.

References

External links
 The New South Wales Systems Biology Initiative
 Skyrails Visualisation System
 Updated Research Projects at the Systems Biology Initiative website

University of New South Wales